Fall from Grace is an American television film about the lives of Jim Bakker and his then-wife, Tammy Faye Bakker, during the 1980s, starring Kevin Spacey and Bernadette Peters in the lead roles. The film, which depicts the events that led to the PTL scandal and the Bakkers' subsequent downfall, aired on NBC on April 29, 1990, as well as during occasional reruns in later years on the Lifetime Movie Network.

Plot
In the 1980s, televangelist and PTL Club founder Jim Bakker (Spacey) and his wife Tammy (Peters) decide to expand their PTL television ministry to include a village resort with an amusement park, which they christen Heritage USA.

However, during this time, the Bakkers are being investigated for various acts of scandalous behavior, beginning with Jim's 1980 affair with then-church secretary Jessica Hahn. They are also investigated for fraud (specifically, using followers' donated funds to support an upscale lifestyle as well as finance the Heritage USA project). These investigations ultimately led to a highly-publicized scandal involving the Bakkers and the PTL ministry in March 1987, which gained national attention. The Bakkers are defrocked and the PTL ministry and Heritage USA are then taken over by another televangelist, Rev. Jerry Falwell. Jim is later sentenced to prison on fraud and conspiracy charges (but this is not depicted in the movie).

Subplots in the film deal with Jim and Tammy's constant bickering, as well as Tammy's drug abuse that led to rehabilitation at the Betty Ford Center.

Bernadette Peters, as Tammy, sings several gospel songs throughout the movie, including "Mercy Rewrote My Life", "Amazing Grace", "God Rides on the Wings of Love", and "His Eye Is on the Sparrow". Peter Matz arranged the music.

Cast
 Kevin Spacey as Jim Bakker
 Bernadette Peters as Tammy Faye Bakker
 Richard Herd as Richard Dortch
 Richard Paul as Rev. Jerry Falwell
 Annie Wood as Jessica Hahn
 Beth Grant as Paulene
 John McLiam as Rev. Aubrey Sara
 Travis Swords as Patrick
 Jon Lindstrom as Brian
 Justin Lord
 Steven Barr as Bodyguard #1
 Rod Britt as Finance Executive
 Robert Broyles as Construction Foreman
 Randy Crowder as TV Director
 Mark Davenport as Real Estate Man
 Keith Joe Dick as Cowboy

Production
The rights to the Bakkers' story were sold to NBC Productions in 1987. After Ken Trevey was hired to write the movie, his assistant interviewed the Bakkers. After the bankruptcy trial in 1989, the script was rewritten. Spacey at first declined the role, but finally decided to take it, because of "Jim's complexity — and a 3½-hour phone conversation with director Arthur." Because Tammy's weight fluctuated, Peters sometimes had to have extra padding; she wears false nails and five wigs. The movie cost $3-million-plus to make.

A Los Angeles Times article noted that both Peters and Spacey said "they had doubts about taking part in the show because of the caricature, Saturday Night Live aspect of their characters", but were assured that they would not play caricatures.

Response
The Entertainment Weekly reviewer wrote that  "Kevin Spacey as Jim and Bernadette Peters as Tammy are absolutely fabulous" but that, in a "miscalculation", the "movie they're in is so petrified of offending religious viewers that it pulls back."

Awards and nominations
Emmy Awards
 Outstanding Achievement in Hairstyling for a Miniseries or a Special—WINNER (tied with "The Phantom of the Opera")
 Outstanding Achievement in Makeup for a Miniseries or a Special—nominated

References

External links
 
 

1990 television films
1990 films
NBC network original films
Films set in 1980
Films set in 1987
Films directed by Karen Arthur